Barastrotia is a monotypic moth genus of the family Noctuidae described by Warren in 1913. Its only species, Barastrotia metalophota, was first described by George Hampson in 1898. It is found in Khasis in north-eastern India and Bangladesh.

References

Acontiinae
Monotypic moth genera